() may refer to:

"Jesus Christus unser Heiland, der den Tod überwand", a.k.a. "Osterlied", part song (D 987/168A) by Franz Schubert on a text by Friedrich Gottlieb Klopstock
"Jesus Christus, unser Heiland, der den Tod überwand", Easter hymn by Martin Luther, cited in:
BWV 364, chorale harmonization "Jesus Christus, unser Heiland" by Johann Sebastian Bach
BWV 626, chorale prelude "Jesus Christus, unser Heiland, der den Tod überwand" in the Orgelbüchlein by Johann Sebastian Bach
"Jesus Christus unser Heiland, der den Tod", chorale preludes by Johann Pachelbel
"Jesus Christus, unser Heiland, der von uns den Gotteszorn wandt", hymn by Martin Luther relating to communion, cited in:
BWV 363, chorale harmonization "Jesus Christus, unser Heiland" by Johann Sebastian Bach
BWV 665, chorale prelude "Jesus Christus, unser Heiland" in the Great Eighteen Chorale Preludes by Johann Sebastian Bach
BWV 666, chorale prelude "Jesus Christus, unser Heiland" in the Great Eighteen Chorale Preludes by Johann Sebastian Bach
BWV 688, chorale prelude "Jesus Christus, unser Heiland" in the Clavier-Übung III by Johann Sebastian Bach
BWV 689, chorale prelude "Jesus Christus, unser Heiland" in the Clavier-Übung III by Johann Sebastian Bach
"Jesus Christus unser Heiland, der von uns", chorale prelude in Erster Theil etlicher Choräle by Johann Pachelbel
 Jesus Christus unser Heiland, chorale fantasia for organ by Heinrich Scheidemann
 Psalmus Sub Comunione: Jesus Christus, Unser Heiland by Samuel Scheidt